General elections were held in Uganda on 10 and 11 December 1980. They followed the overthrow of Idi Amin the previous year and were the first since the pre-independence elections in 1962. The result was a victory for the Uganda People's Congress (UPC) of President Milton Obote, which won 75 of the 126 seats. Voter turnout was 85%.

The UPC was the only party to contest all 126 seats, and its candidates were returned unopposed in seventeen constituencies.  The opposition claimed that the UPC had only won through widespread fraud.

Results

References

General
Elections in Uganda
Uganda
Uganda